Schraeder or Von Schraeder is a German surname, a variant of Schröder. Notable people with the surname include:

Eric Schraeder
Fred J. Schraeder
Jeanna Schraeder
Ryan Schraeder

Fictional characters
Baroness Elsa Schraeder from The Sound of Music (film)
Griffin Schraeder from Movie 43
Helmut Von Schraeder, the protagonist from Twist of Fate (1989 TV series)
Joseph von Schraeder from Working Girls (1931 film)
Kurt Schraeder from Teen Idol (novel)
Martin Schraeder from Night Watch (1995 film)

See also

Schaeder

German-language surnames